Hamstead railway station serves the Hamstead, Great Barr and Handsworth Wood areas of Birmingham, England. It is located at the junction of Rocky Lane and Old Walsall Road, Hamstead, at Birmingham's border with the borough of Sandwell.  It is situated on the Birmingham-Walsall Line, part of the former Grand Junction Railway, opened in 1837. The station, and all trains serving it, are operated by West Midlands Trains.

A bridge carrying Old Walsall Road over the railway serves as the only means for passengers to cross from one platform to the other.

History 

The station was opened by the Grand Junction Railway (GJR) on 4 July 1837, and was named Hamstead and Great Barr; it was renamed Great Barr by the London and North Western Railway (LNWR, the successor to the GJR) on 1 May 1875. The same year an LNWR Type 3, 'size C' signalbox was erected at the station. The platforms were originally on opposite sides of the road bridge, with the down (Walsall-bound) platform to the west, but that platform was resited opposite the up platform on 25 March 1899. Sidings, controlled by the signalbox, served the adjacent Hamstead Colliery, west of the station and north of the line.

The line through the station was electrified in 1966 as part of the London Midland Region's electrification programme. The actual energization of the line from Coventry to Walsall through Aston took place on 15 August 1966. The road bridge was replaced and the signalbox removed as part of the works (the nameplate from the signalbox is now in Chasewater Railway Museum). The station was renamed Hamstead on 6 May 1974.

Occasionally, such as during Storm Dennis in February 2020, the nearby River Tame overflows and floods the station.

Facilities
The wooden ticket office is located on the Birmingham New Street-bound platform and is staffed part-time seven days per week.  A self-service ticket machine is situated outside this structure for use when the office is closed and for collecting pre-paid tickets.  A modern waiting shelter is located on the opposite side, with customer help points, CIS screens and automated announcements on both sides used to offer train running information.  Both platforms have step-free access from the street.

Services
The typical Monday-Saturday daytime service sees two trains per hour in each direction between Walsall and Birmingham New Street (and through towards ). Services are reduced to one train per in the evenings and on Sundays.

All trains serving the station are operated by West Midlands Trains.

In the case of engineering work on the line (which often occurs on Sundays), Hamstead is usually the last stop for trains to Birmingham from Walsall or the Chase Line. Such services deviate from normal running at Perry Barr North Junction and enter New Street through Soho, merging with the Birmingham to Wolverhampton line just south of Smethwick Rolfe Street.  A replacement bus service operates on these days to Hamstead from New Street, calling Duddeston, Aston and Witton beforehand.

Nearby
Hamstead also serves:
 Perry Hall Park (west end)
 Sandwell Valley
 RSPB Sandwell Valley

References

External links

Rail Around Birmingham and the West Midlands: Hamstead railway station
Railways of Warwickshire entry

Railway stations in Birmingham, West Midlands
DfT Category E stations
Former London and North Western Railway stations
Railway stations in Great Britain opened in 1837
Railway stations in Great Britain closed in 1899
Railway stations in Great Britain opened in 1899
Railway stations served by West Midlands Trains
Great Barr